Guglielmo Giannini (14 October 1891 – 10 October 1960) was an Italian politician, journalist, writer, director and dramaturge.

Biography 

Guglielmo Giannini was born in Pozzuoli, by Federico Giannini and Mary Jackson, and grew up in Naples. He practiced many different trades (from bricklayer to a clerk in a cloth shop) before coming to journalism, in modest satirical papers. Travelling around Europe, he became fond of the crime novel and began to write various scripts with this technique.

Subsequently, introduced by his father, he pursued a journalistic career. He fought as a volunteer in the Italo-Turkish War (1911–1912) and participated in the First World War. At the end of the "Great War", he moved to Rome and returned to the profession of journalist. During this period he began to work also as a playwright.

Contrary to Italy's entry into the Second World War (a choice dictated by the conviction that defeat was certain), he struggled for this position to continue working.

In 1942, during the war conflict, his son Mario died in a plane crash in the Falconara Marittima airport. To this disgrace he dedicated the essay La folla, written after the news of his son's death, printed in 1945 and published in 1946. This tragedy contributed to rooting in him an indiscriminate hatred for the political class, and in particular for his leaders, without distinction of membership.

In 1943, Giannini also directed four feature films in a year, including Grattacieli and 4 ragazze sognano, both with Paolo Stoppa as the protagonist.

On 27 December 1944 Giannini founded a new weekly, "L'Uomo qualunque" (translatable as The Common Man or The Ordinary Man), which in May 1945 exceeded 800 thousand copies.

Tired of the fascist dictatorship and the intrusion of politics in the lives of private citizens, but also of the return of traditional parties, Giannini, following the success of the weekly newspaper, founded an opinion movement called Common Man's Front. The movement, based on a new political pseudo-ideology, called "qualunquismo". Retrieved 5.3% of the votes in the parliamentary election of 1946, getting 30 deputies to the Constituent assembly, including Giannini himself, who became group leader in the Parliament.

In 1947, Giannini, after having tried an alliance with the Christian Democracy and the Italian Social Movement, approached the communist leader Palmiro Togliatti, defined two years before as "worm, rogue and forger". Many sympathizers of the Common Man's Front, astounded by this choice, abandoned Giannini who so enounced the pact of friendship with the Italian Communist Party to make an alliance with the Italian Liberal Party. Anyway, in the parliamentary election of 1948 the FUQ-PLI alliance obtained only 3.8% of the vote; Giannini was elected to the Chamber and joined the Mixed Group. After the electoral failure, Giannini resigned as president of the Common Man's Frontin October 1948. In 1953, Giannini was a candidate with the Christian Democracy and in 1958 with the People's Monarchist Party, but in both cases he was not elected.

Electoral history

Filmography 

 Duetto vagabondo  (1939)
 Il nemico (1943)
 4 ragazze sognano (1943)
 Grattacieli (1943)

References

1891 births
1960 deaths
Christian Democracy (Italy) politicians
Common Man's Front politicians
Italian directors
Italian monarchists
Members of the Constituent Assembly of Italy
Deputies of Legislature I of Italy
20th-century Italian journalists
People from Pozzuoli